Emmett E. Rogers (born October 11, 1867 in Hot Springs, Arkansas; died: October 24, 1941 in Fort Smith, Arkansas) was a catcher in Major League Baseball in the 19th century.

Sources

1867 births
1941 deaths
19th-century baseball players
Baseball players from Arkansas
Major League Baseball catchers
Toledo Maumees players
Hot Springs Blues players
St. Joseph Reds players
Fort Worth Panthers players
San Antonio Missionaries players
Houston Mud Cats players
Toledo Black Pirates players
Minneapolis Millers (baseball) players
Oconto (minor league baseball) players
Lincoln Rustlers players
Los Angeles Seraphs players
Galveston Sand Crabs players
Memphis Fever Germs players
Troy Washerwomen players
Scranton Indians players
Shenandoah Huns players
Easton Dutchmen players
Scranton Coal Heavers players
Pottsville (minor league baseball) players
Pottsville Greys players
Rome Romans players
Sportspeople from Hot Springs, Arkansas
Waco Tigers players